Joe Mondragon (February 2, 1920 – July 1987) was an American jazz bassist.

Early life 
Mondragon was born in Antonito, Colorado, and raised in the Española Valley region of New Mexico. Mondragon was of Apache and Hispanic origin.

Career 
Mondragon was an autodidact on bass, and began working professionally in Los Angeles. He served in the United States Army during World War II, and then joined Woody Herman's First Herd in 1946. Over the next two decades, he became one of the more popular studio bassists for jazz recording on the West Coast, appearing on albums by June Christy, Shorty Rogers, Shelly Manne, Buddy Rich, Buddy DeFranco, Marty Paich, Claude Williamson, Georgie Auld, Chet Baker, Bob Cooper, Harry Sweets Edison, Gerry Mulligan, Art Pepper, Bud Shank and Ella Fitzgerald. Mondragon can also be heard on soundtracks for films such as The Wild One and Pete Kelly's Blues.

Mondragon never recorded as a leader.

Personal life 
Mondragon died in San Juan Pueblo, New Mexico.

Discography

With Georgie Auld
In the Land of Hi-Fi with Georgie Auld and His Orchestra (EmArcy, 1955)

With Chet Baker
Grey December (Pacific Jazz, 1953 [1992])
Pretty/Groovy (World Pacific, 1953 [1958])
The Trumpet Artistry of Chet Baker (Pacific Jazz, 1953)
Chet Baker & Strings (Columbia, 1954)

With Louie Bellson
Louis Bellson Swings Jule Styne (Verve, 1960)

With Buddy Bregman
Swinging Kicks (Verve, 1957)

With Hoagy Carmichael
Hoagy Sings Carmichael (Pacific Jazz, 1956)

With Bobby Darin
 Love Swings (Atco Records, 1961)
 Winners (Capitol Records, 1964)
 Venice Blue (Capitol Records, 1965)
 Bobby Darin Sings The Shadow of Your Smile (Atlantic Records, 1966)

With Harry Edison
Sweets (Clef, 1956)

With Herb Ellis and Jimmy Giuffre
 Herb Ellis Meets Jimmy Giuffre (Verve, 1959)

With Woody Herman
Songs for Hip Lovers (Verve, 1957)

With Lena Horne
 Lena...Lovely and Alive (RCA Victor, 1962)

With Harry James
Harry James and His Orchestra 1948–49 (Big Band Landmarks Vol. X & XI, 1969)

With Stan Kenton
Lush Interlude (Capitol, 1958)

With Barney Kessel
Carmen (Contemporary, 1959)

With Peggy Lee
 Things Are Swingin' (Capitol Records, 1958)
 Mirrors (A&M Records, 1975)

With Henry Mancini
More Music from Peter Gunn (RCA, 1959)

With Shelly Manne
The West Coast Sound (Contemporary, 1955)

With Warne Marsh
Live in Hollywood (Xanadu, 1952 [1979])

With Carmen McRae
Can't Hide Love (Blue Note, 1976)

With Jack Montrose
Arranged by Montrose (Pacific Jazz, 1954)

With Gerry Mulligan
Gerry Mulligan Quartet Volume 1 (Pacific Jazz, 1952)
Lee Konitz Plays with the Gerry Mulligan Quartet (Pacific Jazz, 1953 [1957]) with Lee Konitz
Gene Norman Presents the Original Gerry Mulligan Tentet and Quartet (GNP, 1953 [1997])

With Oliver Nelson
Zig Zag (Original Motion Picture Score) (MGM, 1970)

With Art Pepper
Surf Ride (Savoy, 1952-1954 [1956])
 Art Pepper + Eleven – Modern Jazz Classics (Contemporary, 1959)

With Shorty Rogers
Shorty Rogers and His Giants (RCA Victor, 1954 [1956])
Collaboration (RCA Victor, 1954) with André Previn
Afro-Cuban Influence (RCA Victor, 1958)
Chances Are It Swings (RCA Victor, 1958)
The Wizard of Oz and Other Harold Arlen Songs (RCA Victor, 1959)
Shorty Rogers Meets Tarzan (MGM, 1960)
The Swingin' Nutcracker (RCA Victor, 1960) 
The Fourth Dimension in Sound (Warner Bros., 1961)
Bossa Nova (Reprise, 1962)
Jazz Waltz (Reprise, 1962)

With Pete Rugolo
Music for Hi-Fi Bugs (EmArcy, 1956)
Out on a Limb (EmArcy, 1956)
An Adventure in Sound: Reeds in Hi-Fi (Mercury, 1956 [1958])
An Adventure in Sound: Brass in Hi-Fi (Mercury 1956 [1958])
Percussion at Work (EmArcy, 1957)
Behind Brigitte Bardot (Warner Bros., 1960)
The Original Music of Thriller (Time, 1961)
Ten Trumpets and 2 Guitars (Mercury, 1961)
10 Saxophones and 2 Basses (Mercury, 1961)

With Lalo Schifrin
Gone with the Wave (Colpix, 1964)

With Astrud Gilberto
The Astrud Gilberto Album (Verve, 1965)

With Bud Shank
Strings & Trombones (Pacific Jazz, 1955)
I'll Take Romance (World Pacific, 1958)

With Carly Simon
 Playing Possum (Elektra Records, 1975)

See also 
 List of jazz bassists

References

Scott Yanow, [ Joe Mondragon] at Allmusic

American jazz double-bassists
Male double-bassists
West Coast jazz double-bassists
1920 births
1987 deaths
20th-century American musicians
20th-century double-bassists
20th-century American male musicians
American male jazz musicians
United States Army personnel of World War II
People from Conejos County, Colorado
People from Española, New Mexico